Cyril Pedrosa (born 22 November 1972) is a French comic book artist, colorist, and writer.

Biography

Early life
Pedrosa was born in Poitiers to a family of Portuguese descent; his grandfather immigrated to France in the 1930s. He wanted to become a drawing artist since his  adolescence, studying animation at Gobelins school, then working from 1996 to 1998 at Walt Disney Animation France, as an inbetweener in The Hunchback of Notre Dame and as assistant animator in Hercules.

Career 
After meeting with David Chauvel, Pedrosa debuted into comics in 1998 with Ring Circus, for which he did art and coloring. A second title followed, Les Aventures spatio-temporelles de Shaolin Moussaka.

In 2006, Pedrosa created his first solo work, the one-shot Les Cœurs solitaires (Hearts at Sea), followed by a second one, Trois ombres (Three Shadows) in 2007.  The album won the Angoulême International Comics Festival Essentials award in 2008  and the National Cartoonists Society Division Award in 2009.

He collaborated with the fanzine Le Goinfre and participated, with Cassinelli and Holbé, of the webcomic Cadavres Exquisis from 2004 to 2007. From 2008 to 2009, Pedrosa drew Autobio for Fluide Glacial, a fictionalized ecological-themed autobiography.  The comic won the Prix Tournesol (Sunflower Award) in 2009, given by The Greens.

In 2012 he published the semi-autobiographical graphic novel Portugal, about a cartoonist exploring his family roots.

In 2013, he founded, alongside Gwen de Bonneval, Hervé Tanquerelle, Brüno and Fabien Vehlmann, the digital comics magazine Professeur Cyclope.

In 2018 he started the political fantasy graphic novel series The Golden Age (L'Âge d'Or), written by Roxanne Moreil.

Works published

 Ring Circus series (written by David Chauvel)
 1998 – Les Pantres 
 2000 – Les Innocents
 2002 – Les Amants
 2004 –  Les Révoltés
 Les Aventures spatio-temporelles de Shaolin Moussaka series (written by David Chauvel, colors by Christophe Araldi)
 2004 –  …À Holy Hole
 2005 – Contre le grand Poukrass !!
 2006 – À Mollywood !!
2006 – Hearts at Sea (Les Cœurs solitaires)
 2007 – Three Shadows (Trois Ombres)
 Paroles sans papiers
 Brigade fantôme (written by David Chauvel)
 2008 – First Time (Premières fois 
– participation in anthology org. by Sibylline, with the story "Soumission")
 2009 – Autobio
 2011 – Portugal
 2015 – Equinoxes (Les équinoxes)
 2017 – Serum (writer; art by Nicolas Gaignard)
 2018 – The Golden Age (L' Âge d'Or, written by Roxanne Moreil)

Awards 
 2008 :  Angoulême International Comics Festival Essentials award, for Trois Ombres
 2009 : Prix Tournesol for Autobio, t. 1
 National Cartoonists Society Division Awards, for Three Shadows
 2011 : Prix Le Point de la BD, for Portugal (Dupuis).
 Prix Sheriff d'or de la librairie Esprit BD for Portugal
 Prix Bédélys Monde for Portugal
 2012 : Prix des Libraires de Bande Dessinée for Portugal
 Angoulême International Comics Festival Prize Awarded by the Audience for Portugal
 Gran Guinigi Award for Best Artist at the Lucca Comics & Games Festival (shared with Fabio Civitelli).
 2018: Prix Landerneau for L' Âge d'Or.
 2019: Prix BD FNAC/France Inter for L' Âge D'Or.

References

External links 
  Cyril Pedrosa's blog (in French)
  Biography of Cyril Pedrosa
 Author's page at Europe Comics

Living people
1972 births
French cartoonists
French comics writers
People from Poitiers
French people of Portuguese descent